The khanates of the Caucasus, also known as the Azerbaijani khanates, Persian khanates,{{efn|
 Ronald G. Suny. "They Can Live in the Desert but Nowhere Else": A History of the Armenian Genocide", (Princeton University Press, 2015), 70; "In 1828 the Russian army took the Persian khanate of Erevan (which nearly a century later would become the capital of independent Armenia) and established a new frontier on the Arax River".
 Rouben Paul Adalian. "Historical Dictionary of Armenia", (Scarecrow Press, 2010), 471; "(...) in the town of Ashtarak in Eastern Armenia during the period of the Persian khanates."
 David Marshall Lang. "The Last Years of the Georgian Monarchy, 1658-1832", (Columbia University Press, 1957), 153; "(...) and to obtain the Persian regent Kerim Khan's recognition of Georgian suzerainty over the Persian khanates north of (...)"
 Alexander Bitis. "Russia and the Eastern Question: Army, Government and Society, 1815-1833", (Oxford University Press, 2006), 223; "(...) Persian khanates north of the Arax."
 S. Frederick Starr. "The legacy of history in Russia and the new states of Eurasia", (M.E. Sharpe, 1994), 259; "(...) to welcome the Russian armies and the annexation of the Persian khanates north of the Araxes River between 1806 and 1828."
 Britannica online, "Azerbaijan", History section (link); "Persian-ruled khanates in Shirvan (Şamaxı), Baku, Ganja (Gäncä), Karabakh, and Yerevan dominated this frontier of Ṣafavid Iran. (...) After a series of wars between the Russian Empire and Iran, the treaties of Golestān (Gulistan; 1813) and Turkmenchay (Torkmānchāy; 1828) established a new border between the empires. Russia acquired Baku, Shirvan, Ganja, Nakhichevan (Naxçıvan), and Yerevan.
 Jo Laycock. Chapter: "Developing a Soviet Armenian Nation: Refugees and Resettlement in the Early Soviet South Caucasus". In: Krista A. Goff, Lewis H. Siegelbaum, eds, "Empire and Belonging in the Eurasian Borderlands" (Cornell University Press, 2019), 108; "The incorporation of the Persian Khanates of Erivan and Nakhichevan into the Russian Empire in 1828 and the addition of the Ottoman provinces of Kars, Ardahan, and Batumi after 1878 were all followed by the movement of tens of thousands of Armenians from Anatolia and Persia into the new Russian imperial territories." Norman E. Saul. "Historical Dictionary of Russian and Soviet Foreign Policy", (Rowman & Littlefield, 2015), 152; "In the wake of the Napoleonic Invasion of 1812, and with the assistance of Great Britain, the Russian Empire concluded the Russo-Persian War (1804-1813), with major gains of disputed territories in the eastern Caucasus, including parts of Armenia and Azerbaijan, ceded by the Persian Empire. The treaty, concluded in the town of Gulistan in the Persian khanate of Qarabag (Karabakh) in October 1813, not only expanded Russian territory beyond the Caucasus Mountains but also relieved Russia of fighting a subsidiary war during (...)."}} or Iranian khanates, were various provinces and principalities established by Persia (Iran) on their territories in the Caucasus (modern-day Azerbaijan Republic, Armenia, Georgia and Dagestan) from the late Safavid to the Qajar dynasty. The Khanates were mostly ruled by Khans of Turkic (Azerbaijani) originRussian Azerbaijan, 1905–1920 By Tadeusz Swietochowski page 272 and were vassals and subjects of the Iranian Shah (English: King''). The khans neither had territorial or religious unity, nor an ethnic/national identity. They were mostly interested in perserving their positions and income.

Persia permanently lost a part of these khanates to Russia as a result of the Russo-Persian Wars in the course of the 19th century, while the others were absorbed into Persia.

List 
The khanates that soon emerged after the death of Nader Shah in 1747 were the following:

 Baku Khanate (1806 occupied and annexed to Russia)
 Derbent Khanate (1806 occupied and annexed to Russia, same year abolished)
 Erivan Khanate (1827 occupied by, 1828 annexed to Russia)
 Ganja Khanate (1804 occupied and annexed to Russia)
 Karabakh Khanate (1805 protectorate of Russia, 1822 abolished)
 Nakhchivan Khanate (1827 occupied by, 1828 annexed to Russia)
 Quba Khanate (1805 protectorate of Russia, 1816 abolished)
 Shaki Khanate (1805 protectorate of Russia, 1819 abolished)
 Shirvan Khanate (1805 protectorate of Russia, 1820 abolished)
 Talysh Khanate (1802 protectorate of Russia, 1826 abolished)

See also
 Treaty of Gulistan
 Treaty of Turkmenchay
 North Caucasus
 South Caucasus
 Russo-Persian Wars
 Armenia
 Azerbaijan Democratic Republic
 Azerbaijan
Baku Governorate
Elisabethpol Governorate
 Erivan Governorate
 Nagorno-Karabakh
 Western Azerbaijan

Notes

References

Sources 
 
 
 

 
 
Early Modern history of Armenia
17th century in Iran
18th century in Iran
19th century in Iran
18th century in Armenia
19th century in Armenia
18th century in Azerbaijan
19th century in Azerbaijan
Former countries in Western Asia
Russo-Persian Wars
History of Dagestan
Islam in the Caucasus